Tinta Negra Mole is a red Portuguese wine grape commonly used in the production of Madeira. It is the most widely planted variety on the Madeira islands and is considered the industry's "workhorse grape". 

The grape produces very high yields of sweet, pale red wine, but is also often fermented without skin contact to produce white wine when making drier varieties of Madeira.

Synonyms
Boxo, Duhamelii, Listan Morado, Listan Negro, Listan Prieto, Molar, Mollar, Mollar De Cadiz, Mollar De Granada, Mollar De Huelva, Mollar Morado, Mollar Negro, Mollar Prieto, Mollar Sevillano, Mollar Zucari, Mollis, Mollissima, Morisca, Negra Mole, Negra Mole Tinta, Negramoll, Pascoal Gomes, Sabra Molle, Tinta Mole, Tinta Molle, Tinta Negra, Tinta Negra Mole, Tinta Sabreirinha, Tinta Sobreirinha

References

Red wine grape varieties
Madeira wine
Flora of Madeira